James Turner Morehead (August 6, 1840 - April 20, 1908) was an American chemist and entrepreneur.

The son of Governor John Motley Morehead, he graduated from the University of North Carolina at Chapel Hill in 1861, where he joined Beta Theta Pi.

Commissioned a lieutenant in the Confederate army, he was wounded at Bristoe Station, Virginia in 1863; he ended the war as a major. 
Following the war, he served two terms as a state senator (1870-1874).

Upon his father's death, he inherited his properties, and soon became a pioneering chemical manufacturer. He and his son, John Motley Morehead III, would found one of the world's leading chemical companies — Union Carbide, assisted by Thomas Willson, who discovered calcium carbide at one of his furnaces.

Willson, through his continuing experimentation with calcium carbide and other chemicals, ultimately contributed to the later war effort during the Spanish–American War.

A serial entrepreneur, chemist, engineer, inventor and author of scientific works, Morehead later entered into cotton manufacturing.

He had one son, John Motley Morehead III, a chemist, diplomat, industrialist, and noted philanthropist; and four daughters: Mary Kerr Morehead Harris (2 children: Trent Harris, William Nelson Harris), Eliza Lindsay Morehead Nelson (1 child: William Harris Nelson), Lily Morehead Mebane (no children), and Emma Gray Morehead Parrish (no children).

Morehead died on April 20, 1908, in New York City.

References

External links 
 James Turner Morehead at NCPedia

American chemical industry businesspeople
University of North Carolina alumni
1908 deaths
1840 births
Morehead family
19th-century American businesspeople